Capitol Medical Center Colleges, Inc. is an accredited school in Quezon City, Philippines, operated in conjunction with Capitol Medical Center, a general hospital. It is also affiliated with the Philippine Orthopedic Center, the San Lazaro Hospital and the National Center for Mental Health.

Courses offered
Bachelor of Science in Nursing
Bachelor of Science in Medical Technology
Bachelor of Science in Radiologic Technology
Bachelor of Science in Physical Therapy

External links
 Official Website

Nursing schools in the Philippines
Universities and colleges in Quezon City